Love Somebody Today is the fourth studio album by the American R&B vocal group Sister Sledge, released on March 16, 1980 by Cotillion Records. The album includes three singles: "Got to Love Somebody", "Reach Your Peak", and "Let's Go on Vacation", which all charted on the US Pop and R&B/Soul charts from late 1979 until 1980.

Background
Like their highly successful We Are Family released the previous year, this album was both written and produced by Nile Rodgers and Bernard Edwards of the band Chic. There were three singles released from this album. The first was "Got to Love Somebody" released in December 1979, which peaked at number sixty-four on the US Pop charts and number six on the R&B/Soul charts. In March 1980, the second single "Reach Your Peak" was released; peaking at #101 on the US Pop charts and #21 on the R&B/Soul charts. "Let's Go on Vacation", the last single released from this album failed to reach the US Pop chart but reached number sixty-three on the R&B/Soul chart. The latter was to be included on the Chic-produced soundtrack album Soup for One in 1982. Love Somebody Today was one of four albums to be written and produced by Edwards and Rodgers in 1980, the other three being Sheila and B. Devotion's King of the World including its hit single "Spacer", Chic's fourth studio album Real People and Diana Ross' multi-platinum selling diana which includes "Upside Down", "I'm Coming Out" and "My Old Piano". Love Somebody Today, along with six other Sister Sledge albums, was digitally remastered and reissued on CD in 2007 by Warner Bros. Records.

The album reached #31 in the US Billboard Hot 100 Album chart.

Track listing

All songs written by Bernard Edwards and Nile Rodgers.

"Got to Love Somebody" – 6:53
"You Fooled Around" – 4:28
"I'm a Good Girl" – 4:11
"Easy Street" – 4:34
"Reach Your Peak" – 4:55
"Pretty Baby" – 4:03
"How to Love" – 4:32
"Let's Go on Vacation" – 5:08

Personnel

Sister Sledge
Kathy Sledge – lead vocals (1, 2, 6, 7)
Joni Sledge – lead vocals (3, 5, 6)
Kim Sledge – lead vocals (4, 6)
Debbie Sledge – lead vocals (6, 8)
with:
Alfa Anderson – backing vocals
Michelle Cobbs – backing vocals
Luci Martin – backing vocals 
Fonzi Thornton – backing vocals
Nile Rodgers – guitar
Raymond Jones – keyboards, Fender Rhodes electric piano
Andy Schwartz – keyboards, Fender Rhodes electric piano
Robert Sabino – piano, Hohner clavinet
Bernard Edwards – bass guitar
Tony Thompson – drums
Sammy Figueroa – percussion
Eddie Daniels – saxophone
Meco Monardo – tenor saxophone
Jon Faddis – trumpet
Ellen Seeling – trumpet
Bob Milliken – trombone
The Chic Strings:
Marianne Carroll – strings
Cheryl Hong – strings
Karen Milne – strings
Gene Orloff – concertmaster

Production

Bernard Edwards – producer for Chic Organization Ltd.
Nile Rodgers – producer for Chic Organization Ltd.
Bob Clearmountain – sound engineer
Bill Scheniman – engineer
Larry Alexander – engineer
Garry Rindfuss – assistant engineer
Jeff Hendrickson – assistant engineer
Peter Robbins – assistant engineer
Ray Willard – assistant engineer
Joe Gastwirt – mastering
All songs recorded and mixed at Power Station Studios, New York

References

External links 
 Sister Sledge - Love Somebody Today (1980) album releases & credits at Discogs
 Sister Sledge - Love Somebody Today (1980) album to be listened as stream on Spotify

1980 albums
Albums produced by Bernard Edwards
Albums produced by Nile Rodgers
Cotillion Records albums
Sister Sledge albums